Lorenzo Da Ponte (10 March 174917 August 1838) was an Italian, later American, opera librettist, poet and Roman Catholic priest. He wrote the libretti for 28 operas by 11 composers, including three of Mozart's most celebrated operas: The Marriage of Figaro (1786), Don Giovanni (1787), and Così fan tutte (1790). He was the first professor of Italian literature at Columbia University.

Early career 
Lorenzo Da Ponte was born Emanuele Conegliano in 1749 in Ceneda in the Republic of Venice (now Vittorio Veneto, Italy). He was Jewish by birth, the eldest of three sons. In 1764, his father, Geronimo Conegliano, then a widower, converted himself and his family to Roman Catholicism in order to marry a Catholic woman. Emanuele, as was the custom, took the name of Lorenzo Da Ponte from the bishop of Ceneda who baptised him.

Thanks to the bishop, the three Conegliano brothers studied at the Ceneda seminary. The bishop died in 1768, after which Lorenzo moved to the seminary at Portogruaro, where he took Minor Orders in 1770 and became Professor of Literature. He was ordained a priest in 1773. He began at this period writing poetry in Italian and Latin, including an ode to wine, "Ditirambo sopra gli odori".

In 1773 Da Ponte moved to Venice, where he made a living as a teacher of Latin, Italian and French. Although he was a Catholic priest, the young man led a dissolute life. While priest of the church of San Luca, he took a mistress, with whom he had two children. At his 1779 trial, where he was charged with "public concubinage" and "abduction of a respectable woman", it was alleged that he had been living in a brothel and organizing the entertainments there. He was found guilty and banished for fifteen years from Venice.

Vienna and London
Da Ponte moved to Gorizia (Görz), then part of Austria, where he lived as a writer, attaching himself to the leading noblemen and cultural patrons of the city. In 1781 he believed (falsely) that he had an invitation from his friend Caterino Mazzolà, the poet of the Saxon court, to take up a post at Dresden, only to be disabused when he arrived there. Mazzolà however offered him work at the theatre translating libretti and recommended that he seek to develop writing skills. He also gave him a letter of introduction to the composer Antonio Salieri.

With the help of Salieri, Da Ponte applied for and obtained the post of librettist to the Italian Theatre in Vienna. Here he also found a patron in the banker Raimund Wetzlar von Plankenstern, benefactor of Wolfgang Amadeus Mozart. As court poet and librettist in Vienna, he collaborated with Mozart, Salieri and Vicente Martín y Soler. Da Ponte wrote the libretti for Mozart's most popular Italian operas, The Marriage of Figaro (1786), Don Giovanni (1787), and Così fan tutte (1790), and Soler's Una cosa rara, as well as the text on which the cantata Per la ricuperata salute di Ofelia (collaboratively composed in 1785 by Salieri, Mozart and Cornetti) is based. All of Da Ponte's works were adaptations of pre-existing plots, as was common among librettists of the time, with the exceptions of L'arbore di Diana with Soler, and Così fan tutte, which he began with Salieri, but completed with Mozart. However the quality of his elaboration gave them new life.

In the case of Figaro, Da Ponte included a preface to the libretto that hints at his technique and objectives in libretto writing, as well as his close working with the composer:

I have not made a translation [of Beaumarchais], but rather an imitation, or let us say an extract. ... I was compelled to reduce the sixteen original characters to eleven, two of which can be played by a single actor and to omit, in addition to one whole act, many effective scenes. ... In spite, however, of all the zeal and care on the part of both the composer and myself to be brief, the opera will not be one of the shortest. ... Our excuse will be the variety of development of this drama, ... to paint faithfully and in full colour the divers passions that are aroused, and ... to offer a new type of spectacle. ...

Only one address of Da Ponte's during his stay in Vienna is known: in 1788 he lived in the house Heidenschuß 316 (today the street area between Freyung and Hof), which belonged to the Viennese archbishop. There he rented a three-room apartment for 200 Gulden.

With the death of Austrian Emperor Joseph II in 1790, Da Ponte lost his patron.  He was formally dismissed from the Imperial Service in 1791, due to intrigues, receiving no support from the new Emperor, Leopold. At this time, he was still banished from Venice (until the end of 1794), so he would travel elsewhere. In Trieste he met the half-jewish daughter of an English chemist Nancy Grahl (who he would never marry but eventually have four children with). In August 1792, he set off for Paris via Prague and Dresden armed with a letter of recommendation to Queen Marie Antoinette that her brother, the late Emperor Joseph II, had given Da Ponte before his death. On the road to Paris, on learning about the worsening political situation in France and the arrest of the king and queen, he decided to head for London instead, accompanied by his companion Grahl and their then two children. After a precarious start in England, exercising a number of jobs including that of grocer and Italian teacher, he became librettist at the King's Theatre, London, in 1803. He remained based in London, undertaking various theatrical and publishing activities until 1805, when debt and bankruptcy caused him to flee to the United States with Grahl and their children.

American career
In the United States, Da Ponte settled in New York City first, then Sunbury, Pennsylvania, where he briefly ran a grocery store and gave private Italian lessons while entertaining in some business activities in Philadelphia. He returned to New York to open a bookstore. He became friends with Clement Clarke Moore, and, through him, gained an unpaid appointment as the first professor of Italian literature at Columbia College. He was the first Roman Catholic priest to be appointed to the faculty, and he was also the first to have been raised a Jew. In New York he introduced opera and produced in 1825 the first full performance of Don Giovanni in the United States, in which Maria García (soon to marry Malibran) sang Zerlina. He also introduced Gioachino Rossini's music in the U.S., through a concert tour with his niece Giulia Da Ponte.

In 1807 he began to write his Memoirs (published in 1823), described by Charles Rosen as "not an intimate exploration of his own identity and character, but rather a picaresque adventure story."

In 1828, at the age of 79, Da Ponte became a naturalized U.S. citizen. In 1833, at the age of eighty-four, he founded the first purpose-built opera theater in the United States, the Italian Opera House in New York City, on the northwest corner of Leonard and Church Streets, which was far superior to any theater the city had yet seen. Owing to his lack of business acumen, however, it lasted only two seasons before the company had to be disbanded and the theater sold to pay the company's debts. In 1836 the opera house became the National Theater. In 1839 the building was burned to the ground, but it was speedily rebuilt and reopened. On 29 May 1841 however, it was destroyed by fire again. Da Ponte's opera house was, however, the predecessor of the New York Academy of Music and of the New York Metropolitan Opera.

Da Ponte died in 1838 in New York; an enormous funeral ceremony was held in New York's old St. Patrick's Cathedral on Mulberry Street. Records indicate that he was originally buried in a Catholic Cemetery on 11th Street between First Avenue and Avenue A. That cemetery was later paved over and the remains of the people buried there were removed to Calvary Cemetery in 1909.  While the exact location of his grave at Calvary is unknown, Calvary Cemetery does contain a stone marker as a memorial. 

In 2009 the Spanish director Carlos Saura released his Italian film Io, Don Giovanni, a somewhat fictionalized account of Da Ponte, which attempted to link his life with his libretto for Don Giovanni.

Da Ponte's libretti
The nature of Da Ponte's contribution to the art of libretto-writing has been much discussed. In The New Grove Dictionary of Music and Musicians, it is pointed out that "the portrayal of grand passions was not his strength", but that he worked particularly closely with his composers to bring out their strengths, especially where it was a matter of sharp characterization or humorous or satirical passages. Richard Taruskin notes that Mozart, in letters to his father Leopold, had expressed concern to secure Da Ponte, but was worried that the Italian composers in town (e.g. Salieri) were trying to keep him for themselves. He specifically wished to create a buffa comedy opera which included a seria female part for contrast; Taruskin suggests that "Da Ponte's special gift was that of forging this virtual smorgasbord of idioms into a vivid dramatic shape." David Cairns examines Da Ponte's reworking of the scenario for Don Giovanni, (originally written by Giovanni Bertati and performed in Venice as Don Giovanni Tenorio, with music by Gazzaniga, in 1787). Cairns points out that "the verbal borrowings are few", and that Da Ponte is at every point "wittier, more stylish, more concise and more effective." Moreover, Da Ponte's restructuring of the action enables a tighter format giving better opportunities for Mozart's musical structures. David Conway suggests that Da Ponte's own life 'in disguise' (as a Jew/priest/womaniser) enabled him to infuse the operatic cliche of disguise with a sense of Romantic irony.

Works 
 Opera libretti:
 La Scuola de' gelosi (1783) – composer Antonio Salieri
 Il ricco d'un giorno (1784) – composer Antonio Salieri
 Il burbero di buon cuore (1786, from the play by Carlo Goldoni) – composer Vicente Martín y Soler
 Il Demogorgone ovvero Il filosofo confuso (1786) – composer Vincenzo Righini
 Il finto cieco (1786) – composer Giuseppe Gazzaniga
 Le nozze di Figaro (1785/86, from the play by Pierre Beaumarchais) – composer Wolfgang Amadeus Mozart
 Una cosa rara (1786, from the comedy La Luna de la Sierra by Luis Vélez de Guevara) – composer Vicente Martín y Soler
 Gli equivoci (1786) – composer Stephen Storace
 L'arbore di Diana (1787) – composer Vicente Martín y Soler
 Il dissoluto punito o sia Il Don Giovanni (1787, from the opera by Giuseppe Gazzaniga) – composer Wolfgang Amadeus Mozart
 Axur, re d'Ormus (1787/88, translation of the libretto Tarare by Pierre Beaumarchais) – composer Antonio Salieri
 Il Talismano (1788, from Carlo Goldoni) – composer Antonio Salieri
 Il Bertoldo (1788) – composer 
 L'Ape musicale (1789) – Pasticcio of works by various composers
 Il Pastor fido (1789, from the pastoral by Giovanni Battista Guarini) – composer Antonio Salieri
 La cifra (1789) – composer Antonio Salieri
 Così fan tutte (1789/90) – composer Wolfgang Amadeus Mozart
 La Caffettiera bizzarra (1790) – composer Joseph Weigl
 La Capricciosa corretta (1795) – composer Vicente Martín y Soler
 Antigona (1796) – composer Francesco Bianchi
 Il consiglio imprudente (1796) – composer Giuseppe Francesco Bianchi
 Merope (1797) – composer Giuseppe Francesco Bianchi
 Cinna (1798) – composer Giuseppe Francesco Bianchi
 Armida (1802) – composer Giuseppe Francesco Bianchi
 La grotta di Calipso (1803) – composer Peter Winter
 Il trionfo dell'amor fraterno (1804) – composer Peter Winter
 Il ratto di Proserpina (1804) – composer Peter Winter
 Cantatas and oratorios:
 Per la ricuperata salute di Ofelia (1785) – composers Wolfgang Amadeus Mozart, Antonio Salieri and "Cornetti"
 Il Davidde (1791) – Pasticcio from works by various composers
 Hymn to America – composer Antonio Bagioli
 Poetry:
 Letter of complaint in blank verse to Leopold II, Holy Roman Emperor
 18 sonnets in commemoration of his wife (1832)
Other
 translations from English into Italian
 several books of elementary instruction in the Italian language
 Memorie (autobiography)
 History of the Florentine Republic and the Medici (2 vols., 1833).

See also

Teresa Bagioli Sickles

References
Notes

Citations

Sources

Further reading
 Baker, Felicity (2021) (edited by Magnus Tessing Schneider). Don Giovanni's Reasons: Thoughts on a masterpiece. Bern: Peter Lang.
 Bolt, Rodney, The Librettist of Venice: The Remarkable Life of Lorenzo Da Ponte – Mozart's Poet, Casanova's Friend, and Italian Opera's Impresario in America, New York: Bloomsbury, 2006 
 Hodges, Sheila, Lorenzo Da Ponte: The Life and Times of Mozart's Librettist, Madison: University of Wisconsin Press, 2002 
 Jewish Museum Vienna (pub.), Lorenzo Da Ponte – Challenging the New World, exhibition catalogue from the Jewish Museum , 

 Steptoe, Anthony, Mozart–Da Ponte Operas: The Cultural and Musical Background to "Le nozze di Figaro", "Don Giovanni", and "Così fan tutte", New York: Clarendon Press/Oxford University Press, 1988

External links

 Acocella, Joan, "Nights At The Opera: The Life of the Man who put Words to Mozart", The New Yorker, 8 January 2007
 Holden, Anthony, "The phoenix", The Guardian (London), 7 January 2006
 Keats, Jonathon, "Lorenzo's Toil", review of Rodney Bolt's The Librettist of Venice, The Washington Post, 16 July 2006
 Lazare, Christopher, "That Was New York: Da Ponte, the Bearer of Culture", The New Yorker, 25 March 1944, pp. 34–51
 Lorenz, Michael, "Lorenzo Da Ponte's Viennese Residence in 1788", michaelorenz.blogspot.com, (Vienna, 1 February 2013)
 
 

1749 births
1838 deaths
18th-century Italian Roman Catholic priests
Italian opera librettists
18th-century Italian poets
18th-century Italian male writers
19th-century Italian poets
19th-century Italian male writers
18th-century Italian musicians
18th-century male musicians
18th-century musicians
19th-century Italian musicians
Wolfgang Amadeus Mozart's librettists
Columbia University faculty
Italian emigrants to the United States
18th-century Italian Jews
Converts to Roman Catholicism from Judaism
American booksellers
American people of Italian-Jewish descent
Naturalized citizens of the United States
Opera managers
American grocers
People from Vittorio Veneto
Burials at Calvary Cemetery (Queens)
People from Sunbury, Pennsylvania
Catholics from Pennsylvania
19th-century Italian male musicians